The 1972 Major League Baseball All-Star Game, the 43rd such game, was played on July 25, 1972. The all-stars from the American League and the National League faced each other at Atlanta Stadium, home of the Atlanta Braves. The National League came away with a 4–3 win in 10 innings.

This was the third All-Star Game hosted by the Braves (1936 and 1955), but the first All-Star Game to be hosted by the team in Atlanta (the previous two being hosted in their previous homes of Boston and Milwaukee, respectively).  This would be the only All-Star Game played in Atlanta Stadium, as the Braves had moved to Turner Field when the exhibition returned to Atlanta in 2000.

After seeing their 8 All-Star Game winning streak ended in 1971, the game would mark the start of an 11-game winning streak for the NL, the longest winning streak by either league in the exhibition's history. This was also the final All-Star Game for Roberto Clemente before his death in a plane crash on New Year's Eve.

American League roster 
The American League roster included 13 future Hall of Fame players and coaches, denoted in italics.

Elected starters

Pitchers

Reserve position players

Coaching staff

National League roster 
The National League roster included 16 future Hall of Fame players and coaches, denoted in italics.

Elected starters

Pitchers

Reserve position players

Coaching staff

Starting lineups 
While the starters were elected by the fans, the batting orders and starting pitchers were selected by the managers.

Umpires

Scoring summary 
The American League opened the game's scoring in the top of the third, with Steve Blass in to relieve Bob Gibson.  Bill Freehan walked, and advanced to second base on a sacrifice bunt by Jim Palmer.  Rod Carew singled, allowing Freehan to score.

The National League would not answer until the bottom of the sixth inning, with Gaylord Perry pitching in relief.  With two outs, César Cedeño singled.  Hank Aaron then hit a two-run home run to give the National League the lead.

The AL would respond in the top of the eighth inning against Bill Stoneman in his second inning of relief.  Carlton Fisk singled, and after a strikeout, Cookie Rojas (pinch hitting for Rod Carew) hit a two-run home run.

Wilbur Wood was in his second inning of relief when, in the bottom of the ninth inning, the National League evened the score.  Billy Williams and Manny Sanguillén hit back-to-back singles, with Sanguillen's sending Williams to third base.  Lee May hit into a fielder's choice, forcing Sanguillen out at second, but permitting Williams to score.  After Ron Santo grounded into a double play, the score was tied at 3, forcing extra innings.

In the bottom of the tenth inning, Dave McNally came on in relief for the AL.  The first batter he faced, Nate Colbert (pinch hitting for Tug McGraw), walked.  Colbert advanced to second on a sacrifice bunt by Chris Speier.  Joe Morgan singled, scoring Colbert and ending the game.

Line score

Game notes and records 
Tug McGraw was credited with the win.  Dave McNally was charged with the loss.

This was the fifth All-Star Game to reach extra innings.  After this one, the National League was 5–0 in those extra inning games.

The home run hit by Hank Aaron was the last one in an All-Star Game by a player from the host team for 25 years. This did not happen again until Sandy Alomar Jr. of the Cleveland Indians homered at Jacobs Field in the 1997 All-Star Game.

The homer by Cookie Rojas, a native of Cuba, was the first one ever hit in an All-Star Game for the American League by a player who was born outside the United States.

Nate Colbert, who scored the winning run, brought the wrong uniform with him to Atlanta. The San Diego Padres' slugger donned his road jersey with SAN DIEGO on it instead of his home one with PADRES on it. Both of San Diego's jerseys in 1972 and 1973 were gold. Seven days after the All-Star Game, Colbert racked up 13 RBI in a doubleheader vs. the Braves in the same stadium, setting a Major League record for a twinbill which was tied in 1993 by Mark Whiten for the St. Louis Cardinals.

With Toby Harrah injured, the Texas Rangers did not have an active player on the AL squad in their first season in Arlington, Texas. The Rangers were originally the second incarnation of the Washington Senators, leaving the nation's capital in November 1971 after 11 seasons.

Players from the Red Sox and Giants debuted double-knit uniforms in this game. After the Pirates (1970), Cardinals and Orioles (each in 1971) were the first teams to switch, two-thirds of MLB (16 of 24) donned new double-knits to begin 1972. The three remaining teams wearing flannels full-time, the Expos, Royals and Yankees, switched to double-kits to start 1973.

Notes

References

External links 
 1972 All-Star Game summary @baseball-almanac.com
 1972 All-Star Game box score @baseball-almanac.com
 1972 All-Star Game play-by-play @baseball-almanac.com
 1972 All-Star Game results @mlb.com
 Baseball Reference 1972 All-Star Game review @ baseball-reference.com

All-Star Game
1972
1972
1970s in Atlanta
Major League Baseball All Star Game
July 1972 sports events in the United States